Korczak may refer to:

People 
Janusz Korczak, a pseudonym of Henryk Goldszmit, Polish pediatrician, children's writer and pedagogist
Korczak (film), a 1990 film on Janusz Korczak
Korczak Ziółkowski (1908–1982), American designer and sculptor of Crazy Horse Memorial
Rozka Korczak, a resistance fighter in Vilnuis ghetto and later a partisan
Zbigniew Korczak-Ziolkowski (died 1553), Roman Catholic priest, Canon of Cracow

Places 
Korczak, Podlaskie Voivodeship (north-east Poland)

Other 
2163 Korczak, main-belt asteroid

See also
Korczak coat of arms
Kortschak, a surname
Josef Korčák, Czech Communist politician (1921-2008)

Polish-language surnames